The 1947 Louisville Municipal Bantams football team was an American football team that represented Louisville Municipal College (now known as Simmons College of Kentucky) in the Midwest Athletic Association (MAA) during the 1947 college football season. In their second season under head coach Dwight T. Reed, the Bantams compiled a 6–1–1 record and was ranked No. 12 among the nation's black college football teams according to the Pittsburgh Courier and its Dickinson Rating System.

Schedule

References

Louisville Municipal
Louisville Municipal Bantams football seasons
Louisville Municipal Bantams football